My Dear Muthachan is a 1992 Malayalam film written by Sreenivasan and directed by Sathyan Anthikad and produced by Joy Thomas. It stars Thilakan, Madhurima Narla, Baby Jomol, Baby Renju and Master Tarun in lead roles, and Murali, Sreenivasan, Innocent, Urvashi, K.P.A.C. Lalitha, Jayaram and Philomina in major supporting roles.

Plot
Meera has three younger siblings, they lost their parents recently and are left with no clue on how to run the business. All the relatives and friends start living with them, exploiting their wealth and making their life difficult. So they hire a person, to act as their long lost grandfather, in order to solve their personal problems. How this person resolves the issues and unravels the secret behind their parents death forms the crux of the story.

Cast

Thilakan as  Parameswaran / Major K. K. Menon
Jayaram as  Parthasarathi
 Madhurima Narla as Meera
Baby Jomol as Maya
Master Tarun as Manu 
Baby Renju as Manju
Murali as  Kuriachan, GM of the company
Innocent as  Sub Inspector K. P. Adiyodi
Sreenivasan as  Dinakaran / Babu Raj/Sebastain
Janardhanan as  Adv. Ananthan Nambiyar
Urvashi as  Clara 
K.P.A.C. Lalitha as  Shantha
Mammukoya as  Punnoose
Thesni Khan 
Devan as Mohan Das
Geetha as Sree Devi
Philomina as  Kunjamma
Sukumari as  Parthasarathi's Mother
Oduvil Unnikrishnan as  Factory Worker
Jose Pellissery as Lawyer at the courthouse

Soundtrack 
The film's soundtrack contains 3 songs, all composed by Johnson and Lyrics by Bichu Thirumala.

References

External links
 

1990s Malayalam-language films
1992 films
1992 drama films
Films directed by Sathyan Anthikad
Indian family films
Films with screenplays by Sreenivasan
Films scored by Johnson